Anton "Toni" Pfeffer (born 17 August 1965) is an Austrian former professional footballer who played as a defender.

After ending his football career in 2000, Pfeffer ran unsuccessfully in local elections for the Austrian People's Party. In 2005, he joined the board of SKN St. Pölten and advises the executive committee on sporting issues.

Pfeffer has also developed a folk singing career with the release of two collections of Austrian folk songs. He currently works as one of Sky Austria's main football pundits.

Club career
Born in Lilienfeld, Lower Austria, Pfeffer joined Austria Wien at 19 years of age and made his professional debut for them in 1987. He stayed loyal to Austria during his entire playing career winning four league titles and four domestic cups. He also captained the team.

International career
Pfeffer made his debut for Austria in an April 1988 friendly match against Greece and was a participant at the 1990 and 1998 FIFA World Cup. He earned 63 caps, scoring one goal. His last international was the embarrassing 0-9 demolition by Spain in a European Championship qualification match in March 1999.

Career statistics
Scores and results list Austria's goal tally first, score column indicates score after each Pfeffer goal.

Honours
Austria Wien
 Austrian Bundesliga: 1986, 1991, 1992, 1993
 Austrian Cup: 1986, 1990, 1992, 1994

External links
 Player profile - Austria Wien archive 
 Manager profile - Austria Wien archive

References

1965 births
Living people
People from Lilienfeld
Footballers from Lower Austria
Austrian footballers
Association football defenders
Austria international footballers
1990 FIFA World Cup players
1998 FIFA World Cup players
Austrian Football Bundesliga players
FK Austria Wien players
Austrian football managers
FK Austria Wien managers